Sir Douglas Allen Booth, 3rd Bt (born 2 December 1949), is an Anglo-American aristocratic screen writer and television producer.

Early life
He is the elder son of Sir Philip Booth (1907–1960), and Ethel (née Greenfield; 1914–2018), a pioneering broadcaster.

He was educated at Beverly Hills High School, California, before going up to Harvard to read American History and Literature, graduating Bachelor of Arts magna cum laude.

Upon his father's death in 1960, he succeeded to the baronetcy.

Career

As a television producer
In 1985, Booth worked as an associate producer for fifty-five episodes of the television series G. I. Joe: A Real American Hero and Robotix. In 1986, he was co-producer for Potato Head Kids and The Glo Friends. From 1992 to 1994, he was producer for 65 episodes of Conan the Adventurer.

As a television writer
In 1978, Booth was a television writer for Yogi's Space Race and Dinky Dog, and from 1978 to 1981, he wrote for The All-New Popeye Hour. In 1979, he wrote for The New Fred and Barney Show, Godzilla, Buford and the Galloping Ghost, and The New Shmoo. In 1980, he wrote for The Flintstone Comedy Show and Drak Pack. The following year, in 1981, he wrote for Spider-Man and His Amazing Friends and Super Friends. In 1981–1982, he wrote for Spider-Man, and in 1982, for The Little Rascals and The Smurfs. In 1983, he wrote for the American TV series Monchhichi. In 1983–1984, he wrote for He-Man and the Masters of the Universe. In 1984, he wrote for The New Scooby Mysteries, Super Friends: The Legendary Super Powers Show, Mighty Orbots and Heathcliff and the Catillac Cats. In 1984–1985, he wrote for The Transformers, and in 1985, for Challenge of the GoBots. In 1986, he wrote for G. I. Joe: A Real American Hero, Potato Head Kids and The Glo Friends. In 1987, he wrote for Garbage Pail Kids and Visionaries: Knights of the Magical Light, in 1988 for Teenage Mutant Ninja Turtles and in 1989 for G.I. Joe: Operation Dragonfire.

In 1990, he wrote for Captain N: The Game Master and The Adventures of Super Mario Bros. 3 as well as Barnyard Commandos. In 1991, he wrote for Peter Pan and the Pirates, G.I. Joe: A Real American Hero and ProStars, in 1992 for My Little Pony Tales, and in 1993 for Mighty Max and Adventures of Sonic the Hedgehog. In 1995, he wrote for X-Men, Skeleton Warriors, Street Fighter and Hurricanes. From 1994 to 1996, he wrote for Iron Man. In 1995–1996, he wrote for Spider-Man, and in 1996, for The Magic School Bus.

Since 1999, Booth has been a writer for the Spanish TV series Yolanda: Daughter of the Black Corsair, and in 2002 for Gladiator Academy and Fix and Foxi, both also on Spanish television. He wrote for Shadow of the Elves for German television in 2004, for Adventurers: Masters of Time in 2005 and The School for Vampires in 2006, all on German television.

Personal life
Married to Yolanda Marcela Scantlebury on 17 November 1991, they have two daughters.
The heir presumptive to the family baronetcy is his younger brother, geologist Derek Booth.

Filmography
Series head writer denoted in bold:
 Dinky Dog (1978)
 Buford and the Galloping Ghost (1978)
 The All-New Popeye Hour (1978)
 Yogi's Space Race (1978)
 The New Fred and Barney Show (1979)
 The New Shmoo (1979)
 Godzilla (1979)
 Drak Pack (1980)
 The Flintstone Comedy Show (1980)
 Spider-Man and His Amazing Friends (1981)
 Spider-Man (1981-1982)
 The Little Rascals (1982)
 The Smurfs (1982)
 Monchichis (1983)
 He-Man and the Masters of the Universe (1983-1984)
 The New Scooby-Doo Movies (1984)
 Super Friends (1984)
 Mighty Orbots (1984)
 The Transformers (1984-1985)
 Heathcliff (1984, 1986)
 Challenge of the GoBots (1985)
 The Glo Friends (1986)
 G.I. Joe: A Real American Hero (1986)
 Potato Head Kids (1986)
 Visionaries: Knights of the Magical Light (1987)
 Garbage Pail Kids (1988)
 Teenage Mutant Ninja Turtles (1988)
 G.I. Joe: A Real American Hero (1989-1991): season 1-2 head writer
 Barnyard Commandos (1990)
 The Adventures of Super Mario Bros. 3 (1990)
 Fox's Peter Pan & the Pirates (1991)
 ProStars (1991)
 My Little Pony Tales (1992)
 Conan the Adventurer (1992-1993)
 Tarzán (1993)
 Hurricanes (1993)
 Adventures of Sonic the Hedgehog (1993)
 Transformers: Generation 2 (1993)
 Mighty Max (1994)
 Street Sharks (1994): season 2 head writer
 Iron Man (1994-1996)
 Ultraforce (1995)
 Tenko and the Guardians of the Magic (1995)
 Darkstalkers (1995)
 Creepy Crawlers (1995)
 X-Men (1995)
 Captain Planet and the Planeteers (1995)
 Skeleton Warriors (1995)
 Street Fighter (1995)
 Spider-Man (1995-1996)
 Dragon Flyz (1996)
 The Magic School Bus (1996)
 101 Dalmatians: The Series (1997)
 Extreme Dinosaurs (1997)
 Where on Earth Is Carmen Sandiego? (1998)
 Pocket Dragon Adventures (1998)
 Roswell Conspiracies: Aliens, Myths and Legends (1999)
 Sonic Underground (1999)
 Yolanda, the Black Corsair's Daughter (1999)
 Gladiator Academy (2002)
 Adventurers: Masters of Time (2004)
 Winx Club (2005)
 Growing Up Creepie (2006)
 School for Vampires (2006)

See also
 Booth baronets
 Alfred Booth & Co.

References

External links
 Sir Douglas Booth on ukwhoswho.com
 

Living people
1949 births
People from New York City
People from Beverly Hills, California
American people of English descent
American people of Jewish descent
Beverly Hills High School alumni
Harvard College alumni
English television producers
English television writers
Television producers from California
American television writers
American male television writers
Screenwriters from California
Baronets in the Baronetage of the United Kingdom
Douglas